The African Academy of Sciences (AAS) is a non-aligned, non-political, not-for-profit, pan-African learned society formed in 1985.

The AAS elects fellows (FAAS) and affiliates. The AAS also awards the Obasanjo Prize for Scientific Discovery and Technological Innovation every two years to an outstanding scientist who contributed to the development of the continent.

History 
The Academy was founded in 1983 following a proposal presented by entomologist Thomas Odhiambo and Mohamed H.A. Hassan (The World Academy of Sciences president at the time) at the inaugural meeting of The World Academy of Sciences (TWAS), in Trieste, Italy.

Odhiambo led a taskforce on the creation of The Academy, which presented its recommendations at a meeting convened on 10 December 1985. Participants at the meeting unanimously adopted the recommendations, turned the gathering into a General Assembly, and drafted and adopted the Academy's founding constitution, which has since been updated. The 34 participants who attended the General Assembly also became the founding fellows of the Academy.

The Academy also developed and implemented four strategies between 1989 and 2005 that focused on forestry research, biotechnology, soil and water management, improved food production and policy and advocacy. In 1988 the AAS launched the journal Discovery and Innovation, which focused on all areas of science and ran until 2012.

At first the Academy was largely unfunded and run by volunteers.
Between 1993 and 1996 Carnegie Corporation of New York and the Rockefeller Foundation helped the organization establish efficient institutional and financial systems.
In May 2005 the Kenyan government gave official recognition to the Academy and extended to it diplomatic privileges given to international non governmental organisations headquartered in Kenya. It also authorized construction of its headquarters on a  site that it owns in the Karen area of Nairobi. A US$5 million endowment from the Nigerian government was used to cover the cost of construction.

On 28 February 2011 Ahmadou Lamine Ndiaye of Senegal was appointed President of the AAS for a three-year term replacing Mohamed Hassan of Sudan. He was the first francophone to hold this position since the AAS was founded. Ndiaye said he wanted to rejuvenate the AAS, and felt that conditions were favorable.
He aimed to open up centers of excellence on the continent where French and English speakers could work on joint research programs.

Felix Dapare Dakora is currently serves as President of the African Academy of Sciences for the 2017–2023 terms.

Governance 
The AAS is governed by:

 A general assembly that consists of AAS fellows and is the highest authority of the academy, which determines its general policy and has an oversight of the governing council.
 A governing council consisting of officers elected by the general assembly. The governing council meets twice a year to create and review the Academy's programmes.

Current members of the Governing Council 
As of 2022, the governing council of the academy has the following members:
 Felix Dapare Dakora, President
 Peggy Oti-Boateng, Executive director
 Barthelemy Nyasse, Secretary General
 Akissa Bahri, Vice President, North Africa
 Elly Sabiiti, Vice President, East Africa
 Francine Ntoumi, Vice President, Central Africa
 Salif Diop, Vice President, West Africa
 Mohamed Iqbal Parker, Vice President, Southern Africa
 Mahama Ouedraogo, Director, African Union Commission for Human Resources, Science and Technology
 Mary Abukutsa-Onyango, Member
 Daniel Olago, Member

Previous Presidents 
 1985–1998 Thomas R. Odhiambo
 1999–2010 Mohamed H.A. Hassan
 2011–2013 Ahmadou Lamine Ndiaye
 2014–2016 Aderemi Kuku
 2017–2023 Felix Dapare Dakora

Fellows

The African Academy of Sciences fellows (FAAS) are Africans who may live in or outside the continent and working on science in Africa are elected by previously elected AAS fellows based on achievements that include their publication record, innovations, leadership roles and contribution to policy. Fellows form a community of scientists formed to engage with governments and policy makers to enable wise investment in the future of the continent.

As of November 2022, the AAS has 547 fellows. From which 34 who are founding fellows who were all elected during AAS inception, 17 honorary fellows, 51 associate fellows (i.e., non founding and honorary fellows from outside the continent), and 445 Fellows with 19.3% female fellows.

Founding Fellows 

34 fellows, all elected at AAS inception in 1985, organised, by countries, alphabetically below:

Honorary Fellows 

As of November 2020, there 17 honorary fellows which started in 2011, below arranged by year.

Associate Fellows 

As of November 2020, there 51 Associate Fellows, which are non founding or honorary fellows from outside the continent).

References

External links 

 , YouTube channel

Scientific organizations established in 1985
Scientific organisations based in Kenya
1985 establishments in Kenya
Members of the International Science Council
Academies of sciences